The Pure Truth is a 1931 American comedy film directed by Florián Rey and Manuel Romero and starring José Isbert, Enriqueta Serrano and Manuel Russell.

It was made at the Joinville Studios in Paris by Paramount Pictures, as the Spanish-language version of the studio's 1929 film Nothing But the Truth. Such Multiple-language versions were common in the early years of sound before dubbing became widespread.

The film's sets were designed by Henri Ménessier and René Renoux.

Cast
José Isbert as Sr. Lamberti
Enriqueta Serrano as Emilia Lamberti
Manuel Russell as Roberto
María Brú as Sra. Lamberti
Goyita Herrero as Sabel
Amalia de Isaura as President
José Soria as Ricardo
Manuel Vico as Apollodorus
Pedro Valdivieso as Reverent Doran
Pilar Casteig as Mabel
Pedro Gonzalez as Silvan  
Antoñita Colomé as Esther
Maria Gonzalez as secretary
Leda Ginelly as Marta
Freddy Castel as Cuban
Joaquín Carrasco as doctor
Pelayo Corgo as banker
Ramón Portavella as gardener
Francisco Alarcon as chauffeur
Gaby Morelle as nurse 
José Sierra de Luna as Cabaret director

References

External links

1931 comedy films
Spanish-language American films
American comedy films
Films directed by Florián Rey
Films directed by Manuel Romero
Remakes of American films
American multilingual films
Films shot at Joinville Studios
Paramount Pictures films
American black-and-white films
1931 multilingual films
1930s Spanish-language films
1930s American films